Native American rhetoric is the rhetoric used by Indigenous peoples for purposes of self-determination and self-naming, in academia and a variety of media.

Overview

Scope 
Studies of Indigenous rhetoric note that the many different Native American communicative traditions draw upon People-specific histories, multiple linguistic systems, geographically distinct though interrelated lands, and contemporary cultural, discursive, and academic modes. Ernest Stromberg writes, “Native rhetoricians appropriate the language, styles, and beliefs of their white audiences in order to establish a degree of consubstantiality. Across divides of language, beliefs, and traditions, Native rhetoricians have had to find ways to make their voices heard and respected by a too frequently uninterested and even hostile audience.’” Native rhetoric and rhetorical practice are influenced by both contemporary and historical circumstances that vary according to the unique cultural contexts of the unenrolled Indigenous peoples, non-federally recognized Indigenous Peoples, and the “574 federally recognized American Indian and Alaska Native tribes and villages.”

Terminology
Indigenous scholars debate various critiques against the labels applied to Indigenous Peoples. In "What We Want to Be Called: Indigenous Peoples' Perspectives on Racial and Ethnic Identity Labels," Michael Yellow Bird argues that the term, Native American, alongside others like it homogenizes hundreds of unique tribal identities and cultures by grouping them under a shared rubric, threatening Indigenous Peoples' rights to self-definition; he also argues that emphasis on the exonym "American" in "Native American" makes the term susceptible to appropriation by majority cultures; a susceptibility which he understands as contributing to the elision of oppression and dominance. For Yellow Bird and some of the respondents to his survey, tribal affiliation and terms emphasizing First Nations sovereignty are preferred forms of self-definition.

Commonalities 
Decolonial and rhetorical scholars have loosely sketched a definition of Indigenous rhetoric — for which they argue a shared relationship to the land and an uneven though shared experience of colonialism is partially responsible. Drawing upon the theories of Gerald Vizenor, recent scholarship has interpreted the written appropriation of imperial discourse in Sarah Winnemucca Hopkin’s (Northern Paiute) and Charles Alexander Eastman’s (Santee Dakota) literary work as rhetorical tactics of survivance that contest the reductive and stereotypical categories supporting colonial constructions of the vanishing "Indian." Native American rhetoric also has some similarities with Indigenous rhetorics in other colonial settings, including with the Sámi in northern Fennoscandia.

Key Concepts in Native American Rhetoric 

 Rhetorical sovereignty is a framework for understanding and engaging Indigenous rhetorical practices. New pedagogical scholarship that develops methods for teaching Indigenous rhetoric has taken up the term, arguing that analytic and rhetorical frameworks must account for Indigenous sovereignty. Influencing this development, Scott Richard Lyons has argued for the creation of pedagogical spaces, frameworks, and methods of writing instruction that recognize Indigenous struggles for sovereignty against the rhetorical imperialism of U.S legislative decisions, the government seizure of Indigenous lands, and government use of American Indian boarding schools to forcefully assimilate Indigenous peoples. He refers to this pedagogical shift as rhetorical sovereignty; for Lyons, teaching treaties and ideological systems as rhetorical artifacts that continue to facilitate Indigenous dispossession alongside Indigenous texts is an expression of rhetorical sovereignty. Lyons defines rhetorical sovereignty as the "inherent right and ability of peoples to determine their own communicative needs and desires in the pursuit of self-determination."
 Survivance, in the context of rhetoric, is the continued presence of Indigenous peoples' communicative, persuasive, and epistemic practices of sovereignty. Rhetorical scholarship derives the term "survivance" from the work of Gerald Vizenor. In Vizenor's work the creation of new stories of Indigenous presence challenges the cultural simulations of the Indian invented by proponents and benefactors of Manifest Destiny. Vizenor writes: "The simulations of manifest manners are the continuance of the surveillance and domination of the tribes in literature. Simulations are the absence of the tribal real; the postindian conversions are in the new stories of survivance over dominance."

 Relationality is the unconscious ideas, discourses, and perceptions of interconnectedness that shape Indigenous rhetorical practice. Where the rhetorician solely drawing from Eurocentric ontologies and epistemologies assumes a disembodied subject position, recent scholarship on methodology argues that Indigenous peoples live ways of being, valuing, and knowing that are rooted in and express a relationality with the earth. These interrelations with the earth—and the responsibility of maintaining proper relationships with the other beings and ancestors interconnected with land—form the fluid limits of what Andrea Rily-Mukavets and Malea D. Powell define as Indigenous rhetorical practices.
 Storytelling and Story are core elements of Indigenous rhetoric and rhetorical practice. Where Eurocentric methods of categorization draw distinctions between literary and persuasive genres—contemporary feminist and rhetorical scholarship argues that embodied non-categorical storytelling functions as theory, rhetoric, and a rhetorical methodology for Indigenous rhetoricians. For Lisa King, Rose Gueble, and Joyce Rain Anderson, stories and storytelling are the rhetorical shifts that allow for broadening of rhetorical practice and rhetoric beyond the Greco-Roman tradition.

References

Mythologies of the indigenous peoples of North America
Rhetoric
Native American literature